Tlacopan, also called Tacuba, was a Tepanec / Mexica altepetl on the western shore of Lake Texcoco. The site is today the neighborhood of Tacuba, in Mexico City.

Etymology
The name comes from Classical Nahuatl tlacōtl, "stem" or "rod" and -pan, "place in or on" and roughly translates to "place on the rods"),

History
Tlacopan was a Tepanec subordinate city-state to nearby altepetl, Azcapotzalco.

In 1428, after its successful conquest of Azcapotzalco, Tlacopan allied with the neighbouring city-states of Tenochtitlan and Texcoco, thus becoming a member of the Aztec Triple Alliance and resulting in the subsequent birth of the Aztec Empire.<ref name=Miguel>León-Portilla, M. 1992, 'The Broken Spears: The Aztec Accounts of the Conquest of Mexico. Boston: Beacon Press, </ref>

Aculnahuacatl Tzaqualcatl, the son of the Tepanec ruler, Tezozomoc, was installed as tlatoani of Tlacopan until his death in c.1430. 
Throughout its existence, Tlacopan was to remain a minor polity within the Triple Alliance. It received only a fifth of tribute earned from joint campaigns with its more powerful allies.

In 1521, The Aztec Empire collapsed as a result of the Spanish conquest of Mexico, led by Hernán Cortés and his native Tlaxcallan allies. 
Over the next few centuries, Tlacopan has been assimilated into the sprawling mega-metropolis of Mexico City. The archæological site of Tlacopan is located in Tacuba, within the present-day municipality of Miguel Hidalgo.

Rulers of Tlacopan

 Aculnahuacatl Tzaqualcatl (c. 1427)
 Totoquihuaztli I (c. 1428), often considered the first tlatoani of Tlacopan; co-founder of the Aztec Triple Alliance.
 Chimalpopoca (?–?)
 Totoquihuatzin (?–1519)
 Tetlepanquetzal (1519–1525), son of Totoquihuatzin.

Tlacopan was mostly leaderless from 1526 to 1550; the de facto ruler was Isabel Moctezuma since the city was part of her encomienda. Business in the city were handled by various appointed governors and nobles unrelated to the previous dynasty.

 Don Antonio Cortés Totoquihuaztli the Elder (c. 1550–1574), descendant of the pre-colonial tlatoani. Made tlatoani'' after Isabel Moctezuma's death.

References

Aztec sites
Former populated places in Mexico
Altepetl
Valley of Mexico
Aztec Empire